Tony Maiden (died 17 February 2004 in Torrevieja, Alicante, Spain)  was an English actor, who is best known for playing “Albert Clifton” in all episodes in the first series of the British television series The Adventures of Black Beauty, premiered on 17 February 1973.

He is also known for playing “Willy” in Outer Touch (1979). He played also the Assistant Boots “E.J. Guy” in S.O.S. Titanic (1979). He also appeared in Keep it in the Family as “Val” (6 episodes, 1971).

On 17 February 2004 he died in Spain.

References

External links
 

2004 deaths
English male film actors
English male television actors